The Men's 10 m synchro platform competition of the 2018 European Aquatics Championships was held on 9 August 2018.

Results
The final was started at 13:30.

References

Men's 10 m synchro platform